Karmitoxin is an amine-containing polyhydroxy-polyene toxin isolated from Karlodinium armiger strain K-0668. It is structurally related to amphidinols, luteophanols, lingshuiols, carteraols, and karlotoxins.

See also
 Prymnesin-1
 Prymnesin-2

References 

Phycotoxins
Polyether toxins
Primary alcohols
Secondary alcohols
Amines
Heterocyclic compounds with 5 rings
Oxygen heterocycles